Robert or Bob Porter may refer to:

Politics
 Robert Porter (Brisbane politician) (c. 1825–1902), alderman and mayor of Brisbane Municipal Council, Queensland, Australia
 Robert Porter (Ontario politician) (1833–1901), member of the Canadian Parliament from Ontario
 Robert John Porter (1867–1922), mayor of Victoria, British Columbia, Canada
 Sir Robert Evelyn Porter (1913–1983), generally known as "Tom", stockbroker and mayor of Adelaide
 Sir Robert Porter (Northern Ireland politician) (1923–2014), Northern Irish politician
 Robert Harold Porter (1933–2018), member of the Canadian Parliament from Alberta
 Rob Porter (born 1977), American White House staffer in the Trump administration

Sport
 Robert Porter (English footballer) (fl. 1888–1889), footballer for Blackburn Rovers
 Robert Porter (Australian footballer) (born 1942), Australian rules footballer for Hawthorn
 Bob Porter (footballer) (born 1942), Australian rules footballer for South Melbourne
 Bob Porter (baseball) (born 1959), American Major League Baseball player for Atlanta Braves

Others
 Robert Porter (sword-cutler) (after 1603–1648), supplied Parliament with up to 15,000 swords during the English Civil War and probably fought at the Battle of Birmingham (1643)
 Sir Robert Ker Porter (1777–1842), British archaeologist and diplomat
 Robert Percival Porter (1852–1917), British-born American journalist and statistician
 Sir Robert Porter (British Army officer) (1858–1928), British Army general and medical officer
 Robert Russell Porter (1908–1986), American radio, television and theater actor and director
 Robert W. Porter Jr. (1908–2000), U.S. Army general
 Robert Porter (bishop) (fl. 1947–1989), Australian Anglican Bishop of The Murray
 Robert W. Porter (neurosurgeon) (born 1926), American neurosurgeon
 Robert William Porter (1926–1991), U.S. federal judge
 Bob Porter (record producer) (1940–2021), American blues record producer and radio presenter
Robert Porter (economist) (born 1955), American economist at Northwestern University
 Robert Odawi Porter, President of the Seneca Nation of New York
 Bob Porter, a character in the UK TV series Teachers